Digna can refer to:

Osman Digna
Digna Ochoa
Digna, Jura, a French commune in the Jura department
Digna, Tibet
Saint Digna can refer to:

Roman martyr (see Digna and Emerita)
One of the Martyrs of Córdoba (9th century).
In Latin, digna means "worthy".